The Brooklyn Papyrus (47.218.48 and 47.218.85, also known as the Brooklyn Medical Papyrus) is a medical papyrus dating from ancient Egypt  and is one of the oldest preserved writings about medicine and ophiology. The manuscript is dated to around 450 BCE and is today kept at the Brooklyn Museum in New York.

The term Brooklyn Papyrus can also refer to Brooklyn Papyrus 35.1446

The manuscript
The Brooklyn Papyrus consists of a scroll of papyrus divided into two parts with some parts missing, its total length is estimated to 175 × 27 cm. The text is on the recto side. The different numbers refer to the upper part (-48, 66,5 × 27,5 cm) and the lower part (-85, 66,5 × 27,5 cm) of the scroll.

The manuscript is a collection, the first part systematically describing a number of different snakes and the second part describing different treatments for snakebites. The manuscript also contains treatments of scorpion bites and spider bites.

The papyrus scroll is dated in between 660 and 330 BC around the Thirtieth Dynasty of Egypt. The text however is written in a style common during the Middle Kingdom which could suggest its origin might be from the Thirteenth Dynasty of Egypt.

Contents
The text proceeds page by page, alternating between the two parts of the papyrus. Thus each complete page starts with 47.218.48 and finishes with 47.218.85 (the accession numbers given by the Brooklyn Museum). The title and start of the work are missing, and the extant part of the first section commences at line 15 of the lower part (designated page 1) and continues to page 2 of both upper and lower parts, terminating at line 16 of the latter. The first section comprises a systematic description of snakes and their bites. The last line states that there have been descriptions of 38 snakes and their bites, of which the first 13 are lost.

The second section starts on line 17, page 2 of the lowers part (47.218.85), and continues almost complete up to the fifth pair of pages. Only the right-hand halves of the sixth pair of pages remain. The second section commences at paragraph 39 with an important introduction:
Beginning of the collection of remedies to... drive out the poison of all...snakes, all scorpions, all tarantulas and all ::serpents, in the hand of the kherep priests of Serqet and to drive away all snakes and to seal their mouths.

The second section then continues with many remedies and a few spells for those bitten by snakes. The format for the remedies is strictly pragmatic, and most are based on the species of snake responsible for the bite, or the symptoms suffered by the victim. The remedies are in the typical format of prescriptions that appear in the Ebers Papyrus and other medical papyri which were apparently intended for lay doctors. This papyrus provides the most striking evidence for the closely parallel roles of the physician swnw and the various priests concerned with healing.

History
The date of the scroll's discovery is not known. It was purchased around 1889 by Charles Edwin Wilbour and donated to the museum by his daughter Theodora Wilbour in the early 1930s. The manuscript might originate from a temple in Heliopolis.

In 1989, French Egyptologist Serge Sauneron published an extensive description of the manuscript in his book Un traité égyptien d’ophiologie - Papyrus du Brooklyn Museum nos 47.218.48 et 85

The ancient Egyptians were well aware of both snake's usefulness in controlling vermin and the dangers posed by its poison. Snake deities were worshipped in hopes of preventing potential attacks by their earthly representatives.

At present the manuscript is not on display at the Brooklyn Museum. The archive numbers are 47.218.48 and 47.218.85.

Snakes listed in Part One of the papyrus

1 Can be saved if the snake is weak 
2 Female pronoun used throughout the description 
Numbers of teeth refer to the bite wound
The word fy may mean viper, or a snake resembling a viper

Gallery

See also 

 List of ancient Egyptian papyri

References

Notes

Literature

External links

5th-century BC works
Ancient Egyptian medical works
Egyptian papyri
Collection of the Brooklyn Museum
Herpetological literature